(born 25 April 2005) is a Japanese amateur golfer. She won the 2022 U.S. Women's Amateur.

Career
In 2021, Baba finished sixth in the Kanto Women's Amateur and seventh in the Kanto Junior Championship. The next year, she won both tournaments. 

Baba qualified for the 2022 U.S. Women's Open at the Boso Country Club in Japan on 25 April, her 17th birthday, carding rounds of 69-70. At Pine Needles Lodge & Golf Club, Baba shot 73-72-70-78 to finish tied for 49th, one of four amateurs to make the cut. 

In August 2022, Baba won the U.S. Women's Amateur, becoming the second Japanese player to capture the title after Michiko Hattori in 1985. Baba won the last six holes of the 36-hole final, ending the match against Canadian Monet Chun with a birdie on the 27th hole, for a score of 11 and 9.

Baba represented Japan at the 2022 Espirito Santo Trophy in France alongside Mizuki Hashimoto and Miku Ueta. They shared third place with Germany, one stroke behind Sweden and the United States.

Amateur wins
2022 Kanto Women's Amateur Championship, Kanto Junior Championship, U.S. Women's Amateur

Source:

Team appearances
Amateur
Espirito Santo Trophy (representing Japan): 2022

References

External links
 馬場咲希 - Japan Golf Association
 

Japanese female golfers
Amateur golfers
Sportspeople from Tokyo
2005 births
Living people
21st-century Japanese women